Stefan Schreyer (born 23 October 1946) is a German athlete. He competed in the men's decathlon at the 1972 Summer Olympics.

References

1946 births
Living people
Athletes (track and field) at the 1972 Summer Olympics
German decathletes
Olympic athletes of East Germany
Sportspeople from Thuringia